The Chase is the second album by Scottish Celtic rock group Wolfstone. It was released in 1992.

Track listing
 "Tinnie Run" - 3:44
The Road to Mount Tinnie Run
The Boys of Ballymoat
Alan MacPherson of Mosspark
 "Glass and the Can" - 4:37
 "The Prophet" - 3:47
 "The Appropriate Dipstick" - 4:19
Lori Connor
The Appropriate Dipstick
John Keith Laing
 "Flames and Hearts" - 5:03
 "The £10 Float" - 5:16
Kinnaird House
The £10 Float
The Cottage in the Grove
 "Close It Down" - 4:38
Close It Down
Duncan Johnstone
 "Jake's Tune" - 4:34
 "The Early Mist" - 4:19
 "Cannot Lay Me Down" - 6:27
Cannot Lay Me Down
The Lady of Ardross

Personnel
Duncan Chisholm: fiddle
Stuart Eaglesham: guitar, vocals
Struan Eaglesham: keyboards
Ivan Drever: guitar, lead vocals
Andy Murray: electric guitar

Additional musicians
Neil Hay: bass guitar
John Henderson: drums
Dougie Pincock: pipes, whistle, flute
Phil Cunningham: accordion

Wolfstone albums
1992 albums